Madingley is a small village near Cambridge, England. It is located close to the nearby villages of Coton and Dry Drayton on the western outskirts of Cambridge. The population of the civil parish at the 2011 Census was 210.
The village was known as Madingelei in the Domesday Book, a name meaning "Woodland clearing of the family or followers of a man called Mada". Madingley is well known for its 16th-century manor house, Madingley Hall, which is owned by the University of Cambridge.

Madingley Hall

The village is home to Madingley Hall, which was built by Sir John Hynde in 1543 and occupied as a residence by his descendants until the 1860s. It is surrounded by parkland. Queen Victoria rented the Hall in 1860 for her son Edward (the future King Edward VII) to live in while he was an undergraduate at the University of Cambridge. The family sold the Hall in 1871.

University of Cambridge
The Madingley Hall estate, including its surrounding park and farmland have been owned by the University of Cambridge since 1948. The manor house is currently used by the University of Cambridge and is the official home of the Cambridge Institute of Continuing Education. In addition to its extensive English gardens, the Madingley Hall estate includes 1150 acres of countryside which are maintained by the University of Cambridge.

Cambridge American Cemetery and Memorial

The Cambridge American Cemetery and Memorial is a major military cemetery and memorial dedicated to American servicemen which was dedicated in 1956. It is situated on the southern edge of the parish of Madingley and close to the city of Cambridge.

3811 American military dead are buried in the cemetery. In addition, the names of 5127 are inscribed on the Wall of the Missing, Americans who lost their lives but whose remains were never recovered or identified. Most of these died in the Battle of the Atlantic (1939-1945) or in the strategic air bombardment of Northwest Europe during World War II. The entire 30½ acres used for the American Cemetery and Memorial were donated to the United States government by the University of Cambridge following World War II.

Village life
The village's former public house, The Three Horseshoes, is now a restaurant though it still has a bar that serves beer. The village has an independent pre-preparatory school which caters for reception to year-two students. The village's community spirit is exemplified by the yearly quiz. There is also a village church, where services are held weekly. The church has a 12th-century canonical sundial on the south wall.

The village has two cricket teams, both playing in the Cambridgeshire Cricket Association leagues and one cricket team playing in the Cambridge Business House Midweek League. Madingley is closely connected with nearby Cambridge and students and dons are commonly seen in the village.

See also
 Cambridge
 Cambridgeshire
 University of Cambridge
 Institute of Continuing Education
 Madingley Road, an arterial road running from Madingley to central Cambridge

References

External links

Madingley Hall
Madingley Parish Community Website
Madingley Parish Church website

Villages in Cambridgeshire
Civil parishes in Cambridgeshire
South Cambridgeshire District